Munali is a constituency of the National Assembly of Zambia. It covers the north-eastern section of Lusaka in Lusaka District, including the suburb of Munali.

List of MPs

References

Constituencies of the National Assembly of Zambia
1973 establishments in Zambia
Constituencies established in 1973